Helix Energy Solutions Inc., known as Cal Dive International prior to 2006, is an American oil and gas services company headquartered in Houston, Texas. The company is a global provider of offshore services in well intervention and ROV operations of new and existing oil and gas fields.

History

1980–1989 
In 1980, Oceaneering executives, Lad Handleman, John Swinden, Don Sites and Rick Foreman left the company and named their new company Cal Dive International. 

Oceaneering was formed in 1964 when Handelman merged his California oilfield diving company, Cal Dive, with Canadian-based Can-Dive and upon his departure Handleman reclaimed his original company name for the new venture. In 1983, Cal Dive Intl. was acquired by Diversified Energy International (DEI) whose financial backing allowed the company to expand with two converted diving vessels. In 1985, Handleman suffered a severe injury in a skiing accident and as a result was paralyzed from the waist down.  Jim Nelson would take over the company and Handleman served as a consultant with the company for five more years.

1990–1999 
In 1990, new CEO Jerry Reuhl, led a management team that included future-CEO Owen Kratz, purchased Cal Dive Intl. from DEI for $11 million with Merrill Lynch acting as the financial partner, providing all of the holding a 45% equity position.  In 1992, after it established a business model of acquiring offshore oil and gas properties near the end of their production life in the Gulf of Mexico, Cal Dive Intl. created a subsidiary called Energy Resource Technology (ERT) to manage its growing portfolio of Gulf shelf properties. In 1993, Cal Dive Intl. management bought Merrill Lynch out in 1993, and then sold 50% of the company to First Reserve Corporation in 1995, to raise more capital to support a growing deepwater program. In 1994, Cal Dive Intl. acquired the Uncle John semi-submersible drilling rig and extended the company's well intervention capabilities. Cal Dive Intl. also purchased offshore energy company Aquaitica Inc. which was the company's first corporate acquisition and added four shallow water diving support vessels to its fleet. In 1997, Kratz succeeded Reuhl as CEO. Kratz had previously served as the COO and Executive Vice President. Kratz was an accomplished oilfield diver who had previously owned his own marine construction company. Shortly after his ascension, Cal Dive Intl. became a publicly traded company on the NASDAQ stock exchange.

2000–2010 
In 2001, Cal Dive Intl. purchased Professional Divers of New Orleans for $11.5 million and acquired 85 percent of outstanding Canyon Offshore shares, and purchased the remaining 15 percent over the next three years. With the acquisition of Canyon Offshore, Cal Dive Intl. could now offer operators ROV, intervention and cable/flowline burial services. In 2002, The world's first deepsea well intervention semi-submersible, the Q4000, is launched into service in the Gulf of Mexico. In 2006, after the acquisition of Helix RDS, a reservoir consultancy company, Cal Dive Intl. changed the corporate name to Helix Energy Solutions Group Inc. to better reflect the company's double-stranded business model of offering contracting services while also maintaining a role as an independent oil and gas producer. The company also moved its stock listing from NASDAQ to the New York Stock Exchange under the new ticker symbol, HLX. In 2008, the Newbuild well intervention vessel, Well Enhancer, was launched into service in the North Sea. In 2010, Helix ESG deployed multiple assets and resources to contain the 2010 Gulf of Mexico Oil Spill. In 2012, Helix ESG announced divestiture plans regarding its subsea construction business unit, Helix Subsea Construction, and the sale of its vessels. Helix ESG also announced that going forward well intervention and ROV services would be its primary contracting businesses and new vessels would be purchased or chartered to meet growing demand in those service sectors. In 2015, Helix Energy Solutions Group saw its profit tumble 78 percent in the fourth quarter as upstreams curb drilling activity. In 2019, the Newbuild Q7000 well intervention semisubmersible vessel is delivered to Helix Energy Solutions

Business units 

Helix ESG is divided into three business units:

Well Intervention 
Provider of a range of well operation, subsea wireline and decommissioning services with specialist vessels and in-house developed equipment that includes the Subsea Intervention Lubricator and the Intervention Riser System. Well Ops’ assets include three purpose-built offshore units along with mobile equipment. Current assets include:
 Q4000
 Q5000
 Q7000
 Siem Helix 1
 Siem Helix 2
 MSV Seawell
 MSV Well Enhancer
 Intervention Riser System (IRS), a tool used in subsea well intervention and subsea well containment. The IRS enables access to subsea well trees while isolating the wellbore pressure as downhole tools like wireline or coiled tubing are deployed or changed out. The IRS is rated to operate up to 10,000 ft of water and  capable of a maximum working pressure of 10,000 psi. It is also a component of the Helix Fast Response System as an emergency intervention tool in the event of a subsea well incident in the Gulf of Mexico.
 Subsea Intervention Lubricator (SIL), wireline or coiled tubing systems used in riserless and diverless subsea light well intervention in the offshore oil and gas industry. SILs allow access to a live subsea well without the requirement of a Blow Out Preventer stack or a marine riser. The deployment of a SIL from a dynamically positioned multi-service vessel (MSV) is significantly less expensive than using a traditional drilling rig for intervention operations. SILs are typically rated to operate between 300 ft and 10,000 ft of water and have maximum working pressures of 10,000 psi.

Robotics 
Helix Robotics Solutions (formerly Canyon Offshore) has been operating ROV support vessels and ROV trenching services globally since its inception in 1996. The company currently operates over 50 ROV and trenching systems including over 45 heavy work class systems and five trenching and cable trenching systems along with four support vessels. Canyon Offshore operates from three regions; Houston, Aberdeen and Singapore. Assets include:
 Grand Canyon II
 Grand Canyon III
 Triton Work Class ROV Systems
 UHD Work Class ROV Systems
 I-Trencher
 T1200 Trencher

Production Facilities 
Helix Production Facilities unit participates with offshore oil and gas producers through negotiated contracting, infrastructure ownership, and reservoir equity interests. Assets include:
 Helix Producer I

Management 
Owen Kratz is the President and Chief Executive Officer of Helix Energy Solutions Group, Inc.

See also

References

Notes

Oilfield services companies
Oil companies of the United States
Natural gas companies of the United States
Petroleum in Texas
Companies based in Houston
Energy companies established in 1980
Non-renewable resource companies established in 1980
1980 establishments in Texas
Companies listed on the New York Stock Exchange